K. Kamaraj was sworn in as the Chief Minister of Madras Province on 13 April 1954. K. Kamaraj ousted Rajaji on 31 March 1954 and was elected the leader of Congress Legislative Party. Kamaraj consolidated his position by offering ministerial position to leaders of Tamil Nadu Toilers Party and Commonweal Party. This event marked the end of Brahmin domination in Tamil Nadu Congress.

First Cabinet 

Members of cabinet who served between 13 April 1954 – 13 April 1957 under the Chief Ministership of Kamraj are

Former Members 
 Following the States Reorganisation Act of 1956, A. B. Shetty quit the Ministry on 1 March 1956 and his portfolio was shared between other ministers in the cabinet.

Second Cabinet
Kamaraj's council of ministers during kamarajars second tenure as Chief Minister (1 April 1957 – 1 March 1962):

Third Cabinet
Kamaraj's council of ministers during his third tenure as Chief Minister (3 March 1962 – 2 October 1963):

References

1954 establishments in India
Tamil Nadu
1957 disestablishments in India